Stanislav Mykytsey (born 7 September 1989) is a Ukrainian professional footballer who plays as a defender for Polish IV liga club Cosmos Nowotaniec.

Career
Mykytsey is a product of FC Shakhtar Donetsk sportive school. He became on loan for FC Zorya Luhansk in Ukrainian Premier League from Summer 2010.

In January 2017, it was announced he was being investigated in a doping case. In March 2017, he was disqualified for one and a half of year.

Career statistics

Club

References

External links
 
 

Footballers from Donetsk
1989 births
Living people
Association football defenders
Ukrainian footballers
Ukrainian expatriate footballers
Ukraine under-21 international footballers
Ukraine youth international footballers
FC Shakhtar Donetsk players
FC Shakhtar-3 Donetsk players
FC Mariupol players
FC Zorya Luhansk players
FC Oleksandriya players
FK Jelgava players
FC Chornomorets Odesa players
Polonia Przemyśl players
Ukrainian Premier League players
Ukrainian First League players
Ukrainian Second League players
Latvian Higher League players
IV liga players
Ukrainian sportspeople in doping cases
Doping cases in association football
Expatriate footballers in Latvia
Ukrainian expatriate sportspeople in Latvia
Expatriate footballers in Poland
Ukrainian expatriate sportspeople in Poland